Andrés Felipe Solano Dávila (born 24 February 1998) is a Colombian professional footballer who plays as a right-back for Croatian Football League club HNK Rijeka.

Club career
Solano joined the youth academy of Atlético Madrid at the age of 16. He was promoted to Atlético Madrid B ahead of 2017–18 season. He made his debut for the reserves on 20 August 2017, in a 3–1 win against Gimnástica Segoviana. He made his La Liga debut on 9 March 2019, in a 1–0 win against Leganés.

On 2 October 2020, FC Barcelona B announced the signing of Solano on a season long loan deal with an option to buy. He made his debut in a 1–0 home win over Gimnàstic de Tarragona the following 18 October.

On 1 November 2020, Solano suffered a cruciate ligament rupture during the 0–0 draw against AE Prat. Following a successful surgery, he was ruled out for the rest of the season.

References

External links
 FC Barcelona official profile
 
 Soccerway

1998 births
Living people
People from Santa Marta
Association football defenders
Colombian footballers
Colombia youth international footballers
La Liga players
Croatian Football League players
Segunda División B players
Atlético Madrid footballers
Atlético Madrid B players
FC Barcelona Atlètic players
HNK Rijeka players
Colombian expatriate footballers
Colombian expatriate sportspeople in Spain
Colombian expatriate sportspeople in Croatia
Expatriate footballers in Spain
Expatriate footballers in Croatia
Sportspeople from Magdalena Department